Adam Paul Bandt (born 11 March 1972) is an Australian politician and former industrial lawyer who is the leader of the Australian Greens and federal MP for Melbourne. Previously, he served as co-deputy leader of the Greens from 2012 to 2015 and 2017 to 2020. He was elected leader following the resignation of Senator Richard Di Natale in February 2020.

Bandt won his seat in the 2010 federal election, becoming the first member of the Greens elected to the House of Representatives at a federal election, and the second overall after Michael Organ, who was elected at a by-election. Bandt first contested the seat in 2007, narrowly losing to the Labor Party's Lindsay Tanner. Following his success in the 2010 election, Bandt retained the seat in 2013, 2016, 2019, and 2022 elections.

Early life and education

Childhood and education 
Bandt was born in Adelaide on 11 March 1972. He is the son of Allan and Moira Bandt. His mother, a teacher and school principal, was born in England and arrived in Australia as a Ten Pound Pom. His father was a social worker who later ran a human resources consultancy. He is of Barossa German descent on his father's side.

Bandt moved to Perth at about the age of 10 and attended Hollywood Senior High School. He graduated from Murdoch University in 1996 with Bachelor of Arts and Bachelor of Laws degrees, and was awarded the Sir Ronald Wilson Prize for Academic Achievement, "which is given to the graduate who best combines distinguished academic performance in law units with qualities of character, leadership and all-round contribution to the life of the university".

Early political activity 
While in high school, Bandt went to his first demonstration, protesting against a visit of a nuclear-powered ship to Fremantle. In his mid-teens, from 1987 to 1989, he was a member of the Australian Labor Party (ALP). Bandt later stated he had left the party because of the removal of free university under Hawke and Keating, and blamed the Higher Education Contributions Scheme. Bandt stated the change "started making education so expensive and putting people in debt".

At Murdoch University, Bandt was a student activist and member of the Left Alliance. During university, he  stated he was inspired by the thought of Leon Trotsky. He was president of the student union and an active campaigner for higher living allowances for students, and for free education. While he was a student in 1995, Bandt described the Greens as a "bourgeois" party, but that supporting them might be the most effective strategy, saying that "Communists can’t fetishise alternative political parties, but should always make some kind of materially based assessment about the effectiveness of any given strategy come election time". Writing for the ABC, former Liberal MP and Minister Kevin Andrews said that this made it clear "Bandt views the Greens as a vehicle for his ideological pursuits".

Pre-parliamentary career 
After finishing university, Bandt worked for student unions. During the period before his election to parliament in 2010, he lived in Parkville, Victoria and worked as an industrial and public interest lawyer, becoming a partner at Slater & Gordon, with unions for clients. He decided to join the Greens in 2004. He had articles published on links between anti-terror legislation and labour laws and worked on issues facing outworkers in the textiles industry. Bandt said he also represented firefighters and coal workers "dealing with privatisation."

In 2006, Bandt published a paper entitled "The Wages of Fear: Labour Laws and Terror".

In 2008, having gone part-time at Slater & Gordon in order to do so, Bandt completed a PhD at Monash University, supervised by cultural theorist Andrew Milner, with his thesis titled "Work to Rule: Rethinking Pashukanis, Marx and Law". It states: "This thesis is an attempt to rethink Marxist legal theory." In 2012, he described his thesis as looking "at the connection between globalisation and the trend of governments to take away peoples' rights by suspending the rule of law", saying he "reviewed authors who write about the connection between the economy and the law from across the political spectrum", ultimately arguing "that governments increasingly don't accept that people have inalienable rights". His thesis was embargoed for three years in the hopes of having it published as a book.

In 2009, Bandt published a paper arguing that emergencies, such as the global financial crisis and war on terror, have been used by neoliberal "strong states" to "undermine basic rights".

Member of Parliament (2010–present)

Bandt was preselected to stand as the Greens candidate for the federal division of Melbourne at the 2007 election against Labor's Lindsay Tanner, the incumbent Shadow Minister for Finance, who retained the seat. Bandt finished with 22.8 percent of the primary vote, an increase of 3.8 percent, and 45.3 percent of the two-candidate preferred vote after out-polling the Liberal party's Andrea Del Ciotto following the allocation of preferences. Nationally, he was the most successful candidate of any minor party contesting a House of Representatives seat.

2010 federal election 

Following the 2007 federal election Melbourne had become Australia's only Labor/Greens marginal seat. Bandt was preselected as Greens candidate for the second time, and ran successfully against a new Labor candidate, Cath Bowtell, at the 2010 federal election following Lindsay Tanner's retirement. Bandt received a primary vote of 36.2 percent and a two-party-preferred vote of 56 percent against Labor, a swing to him of 13.4 and 10.8 points, respectively. He was elected on the ninth count after over three-quarters of Liberal preferences flowed to him, enabling him to overtake Bowtell and become the first Green candidate to win a seat in a general election.

His main policy interests are environmental and human rights issues, having "nominat[ed] pushing for a price on carbon, the abolition of mandatory detention of asylum seekers and changing the law to recognise same-sex marriage as his top priorities in parliament."

Deputy Leader of the Greens (2012–2015, 2017–2020) 
In 2012, Bandt was elected deputy leader of the Greens following Bob Brown's retirement from politics and as leader of the Greens.
In the 2013 federal election Bandt was re-elected to the seat of Melbourne, despite an overall decrease in the Greens' vote and Liberal Party directing preferences to Labor ahead of The Greens. Bandt retained the seat with a 42.6% primary and 55.2% two-party-preferred vote, with his two-candidate majority almost untouched. Bandt sat on Christine Milne's frontbench.

In 2015, upon the change of Green leadership from Christine Milne to Richard Di Natale, Bandt did not re-contest the deputy leadership saying he had a baby due in the upcoming weeks. Scott Ludlam and Larissa Waters were elected unopposed as co-deputies.

Bandt was re-elected as Member for Melbourne for a third time at the 2016 election, pushing Labor into third place, and the overwhelming preference for him over the Liberals from Labor voters allowed him to increase his two-candidate-preferred vote to 68.48%. In 2017, the Party's co-deputy leaders Larissa Waters and Scott Ludlam were found to be ineligible to sit in Australia's Parliament owing to their status as dual citizens. Rachel Siewert and Bandt were made temporary co-deputy leaders. Bandt achieved national headlines in February 2018 for accusing new senator Jim Molan of war crimes after it was revealed that Molan had shared anti-Muslim content made by far-right party Britain First on their Facebook account. Bandt later apologised.

Bandt retained his seat of Melbourne at the 2019 federal election with a primary vote of 49.3%, the highest primary vote for the Greens in the history of the electorate. Bandt also received a 4.8% swing in his favour at the election, and his two-party preferred vote against the Liberals rose to 71.8%. The Greens' primary vote in Melbourne (49.3%) was larger than the combined Liberal and Labor vote, of 21.5% and 19.7% respectively, and almost twice as high as their second-highest primary vote (in Wills).

Leader of the Greens (2020–present) 
On 3 February 2020, Richard Di Natale announced his resignation as leader of the Greens and imminent retirement from politics, citing family reasons. Bandt announced his candidacy for the leadership shortly after. On 4 February, he was elected unopposed. Larissa Waters was elected unopposed as co-deputy, with Nick McKim defeating Sarah Hanson-Young and Mehreen Faruqi to become the second co-deputy. Bandt has been described by the political journalist Paddy Manning as the first Greens leader from the Left wing of the party.

Since taking on the leadership of the Greens, Bandt has refocused the party's energy towards campaigning for an Australian Green New Deal, to address what he refers to as a "climate and environment emergency." According to Bandt, it would involve the "government taking the lead to create new jobs and industries, and universal services to ensure no one is left behind." Bandt has also focused on relations between his party and regional communities with the intent of visiting mining townships and farmers across Australia, arguing that his party is "the only one" trying to stop climate change from "devastating agriculture". He has adopted a pro-mining message, but with a focus on expanding the lithium industry and other minerals necessary for a zero-carbon economy; rather than on coal. Under Bandt's vision, the party aspired to develop a power-sharing situation with a Labor government at the 2022 election, similar to the Gillard era.

Whilst serving as party leader, Bandt also acts as the Greens' spokesperson for: the Climate Emergency, Energy, Employment & Workplace Relations, and the Public Sector.

In the 2022 federal election, Bandt retained his seat in Melbourne with a primary vote of 49.6%, beating that of his previous election. However, there was a 12.4% swing against him in the two-candidate-preferred vote. The Greens gained three further seats in the House of Representatives and three in the Senate, with an increase in popular vote by 1.9% to 12.3%.

On 19 June 2022, Bandt had the Australian flag removed from behind the podium at a media conference of his, saying that it "represented lingering pain" for some Australians. His action received varied responses, including condemnation, with newly-elected Prime Minister Anthony Albanese stating that Bandt should "reconsider his position and work to promote unity and reconciliation."

On 9 September 2022, one day after the death of Queen Elizabeth II, Bandt tweeted "Rest In Peace Queen Elizabeth II. Our thoughts are with her family and all who loved her. Now Australia must move forward. We need Treaty with First Nations people, and we need to become a Republic." 7News reported that the tweet triggered "a wave of criticism". Former Minister for Immigration Alex Hawke labelled his words as "truly graceless and bereft of common decency". Others criticised Bandt for using the Queen’s death to make a political point.

Political views
Bandt is to the left of the historical Green Party. Political journalist Paddy Manning says Bandt is hard left, like former Greens Senator Lee Rhiannon, whom former Greens leader Bob Brown "tried to push out of the party." Manning continues, "But, unlike Rhiannon, Bandt is not divisive."

Bandt has been described as different to previous Greens leaders due to his emphasis on "public ownership, public wealth, and community-driven responses to the links between climate change and capitalism". Following Virgin Airlines Australia undergoing voluntary administration in 2020, Bandt called for the government to purchase the airline "at bargain basement prices".

Bandt believes that  Australia should become a republic.

Personal life
Bandt's partner is former Labor staffer Claudia Perkins, who now works as a part-time yoga teacher. They have two daughters together.

References

External links
 
 

1972 births
Australian barristers
Australian Greens members of the Parliament of Australia
Australian people of German descent
Australian solicitors
Members of the Australian House of Representatives
Members of the Australian House of Representatives for Melbourne
Leaders of the Australian Greens
Living people
Monash University alumni
Murdoch University alumni
Politicians from Adelaide
Lawyers from Adelaide
21st-century Australian lawyers
21st-century Australian politicians
Australian republicans